In Greek mythology and religion, Themis is the goddess and personification of justice, divine order, law, and custom. She is one of the twelve Titan children of Gaia and Uranus, and the second wife of Zeus. She is associated with oracles and prophecies, including the Oracle of Delphi. Her symbol is the Scales of Justice.

Name
Themis means "divine law" rather than human ordinance, literally "that which is put in place", from the Greek verb títhēmi (τίθημι), meaning "to put."

To the ancient Greeks she was originally the organizer of the "communal affairs of humans, particularly assemblies."  Moses Finley remarked of themis, as the word was used by Homer in the 8th century BCE, to evoke the social order of the 10th- and 9th-century Greek Dark Ages:

Finley adds, "There was themis—custom, tradition, folk-ways, mores, whatever we may call it, the enormous power of 'it is (or is not) done.'"

In the Hymn to Apollo, Themis is referred to as "Ichnaea", meaning "Tracker".

Description

Some classical descriptions of Themis describe a sober-looking woman holding scales. Themis is an earth goddess much like her mother, Gaia, and in some stories it is hard to tell the two apart. Some classical depictions of Themis show her holding a sword.

When Themis is disregarded, Nemesis brings just and wrathful retribution; thus Themis shared the small temple at Rhamnous with Nemesis. Themis is not wrathful; when a distraught Hera returned to Olympus after quarrelling with Zeus, Themis, "of the lovely cheeks," was the first to offer her a cup.

Themis presided over the proper relation between man and woman, the basis of the rightly ordered family (the family was seen as the pillar of the deme). Judges were often referred to as themistopóloi (the servants of Themis).  Such was also the basis for order upon Olympus.  Even Hera addressed her as "Lady Themis".

Hesiod
Themis occurred in Hesiod's Theogony as the first recorded appearance of Justice as a divine personage. Drawing not only on the socio-religious consciousness of his time but also on many of the earlier cult-religions, Hesiod described the forces of the universe as cosmic divinities. Hesiod portrayed temporal justice, Dike, as the daughter of Zeus and Themis. Dike executed the law of judgments and sentencing and, together with her mother Themis, she carried out the final decisions of Moirai.

Aeschylus
In the play Prometheus Bound, traditionally attributed to Aeschylus, it is said by Prometheus that Themis is called many names, including Gaia.

Family
In Hesiod's Theogony, Themis is one of the twelve Titan children of Gaia (Earth) and Uranus (Sky). She is the second wife of her nephew Zeus, by whom she is the mother of the Horae (Seasons), listed as Eunomia (Law), Dike (Justice), Eirene (Peace), and the Moirai (Fates), listed as Clotho, Lachesis and Atropos. Similarly to Hesiod's account, the Orphic Hymn to Themis calls her the daughter of Gaia and Uranus, and the Orphic Hymn to the Seasons calls her the mother, by Zeus, of the Horae.

Hyginus, in his Fabulae, makes Themis the daughter of Aether and Terra (Earth), and by Zeus the mother of the Horae. In the play Prometheus Bound, traditionally attributed to Aeschylus, Themis is the mother of Prometheus, while according to a scholion on Euripides' play Hippolytus, Themis is mother of the Hesperides by Zeus.

Mythology 
Themis built the Oracle at Delphi and was herself oracular. According to another legend, Themis received the Oracle at Delphi from Gaia and later gave it to Phoebe, who gave it to her grandson Apollo as a birthday gift. According to Ephorus, Themis helped Apollo find the oracle, with the intent of helping mankind. Some examples of Themis' visions; In  the story of Dryope in Ovid's Metamorphoses, Themis warns the gods of an oncoming civil war in Thebes. In another tale she warns Zeus and Poseidon to not marry Thetis because her son will be more powerful than his father. According to Ovid, it was Themis rather than Zeus who told Deucalion to throw the bones of "his Mother" over his shoulder to create a new race of humankind after the deluge. Also according to Ovid, Themis prophesied that a son of Zeus will steal golden apples from the orchard of Atlas.

In Homer's Iliad she is tasked with calling the gods to council on Olympus by Zeus.

Themis was present at Delos to witness the birth of Apollo, and nursed him with nectar and ambrosia. In his De Astronomica, Hyginus lists Themis, in addition to the nymph Amalthea, as the foster-mother and nurse of the young Zeus. In a fragment of Pindar, Themis was brought from the springs of Oceanus by the Moirai (in this version not her daughters) to Olympus, where she became the first wife of Zeus (rather than the second), and by him the mother of the Horae.

According to the lost Cypria by Stasinus of Cyprus, Themis and Zeus together plotted the start of the Trojan War. According to Quintus Smyrnaeus, when the gods defied the orders of Zeus and started fighting each other after the creation of the Trojan Horse, Themis stopped them by warning them of Zeus's wrath.

In the Orphic "Rhapsodic Theogony", or Rhapsodies, (first century BC/AD) Nyx (Night) prophesied that Themis would remain a virgin until Rhea gave birth to a child of Cronus.

Themis also played a role in Eros, the young god of love, growing up; according to Porphyry, his mother Aphrodite was worried about her son, Eros, staying a child forever and brought him to Themis. Themis told her to give Eros a brother, as he wasn't growing because of his solitude. Aphrodite then gave birth to another love god, Anteros (meaning "counter-love"), and Eros grew whenever he was near him. But every time Anteros was away, Eros shrank back to his previous, small form.

When four Cretan men (Aegolius, Celeus, Cerberus and Laius) broke into the sacred cavern in Crete where Rhea had given birth to Zeus in order to steal some of the honey produced there by the sacred bees, Themis and her daughters the Fates convinced Zeus against killing them inside the holy cave, as they considered it impious for anyone to die in the cave, so instead he turned all four into different birds.

Cult
Themis had several temples in Greece, though they are not described in any great detail by ancient authors. She had temples at the oracular shrine of Zeus at Dodona, at Tanagra, in Athens nearby to the Acropolis, a temple in Rhamnous beside one of Nemesis, and a Temple of Themis Ikhnaia in Phthiotis, Thessalia. Pausanias describes her sanctuary in Thebes in somewhat more detail than what was normally the case and it may therefore have been of more importance:
 Along the road from the Neistan gate [at Thebes, Boiotia] are three sanctuaries. There is a sanctuary of Themis, with an image of white marble; adjoining it is a sanctuary of the Moirai (Moirae, Fates) [her daughters], while the third is of Zeus Agoraios (of the Market.)

Themis also had an altar in Olympia: "On what is called the Stomion (Mouth) the altar to Themis has been built." Themis was sometimes depicted in the sanctuaries of other gods and may have shared temples with them occasionally, and she is mentioned to have shared a temple with Aphrodite in Epidauros: "Within the grove [of the sanctuary of Asklepios (Asclepius) at Epidauros] are a temple of Artemis, an image of Epione, a sanctuary of Aphrodite and Themis, a race-course."

The temple of Themis in Athens is found west of the theater of Dionysus. Themis' temple in Dodona is tetrastyle pronaos in antis with a cella, an entrance on the northside and outside was a large altar. The temple columns in Dodona were Ionic made out of local sandstone.

Modern depictions 

Themis in modern-day depictions is often called "Lady Justice" and statues can be found outside many courthouses.

Genealogy

See also 
 Adikia, goddess of injustice
 Adrestia, goddess of retribution
 Raguel, angel of justice

Notes

References 

 Aeschylus, The Eumenides in Aeschylus, with an English translation by Herbert Weir Smyth, Ph. D. in Two volumes, Vol. 2, Cambridge, Massachusetts, Harvard University Press, 1926, Online version at the Perseus Digital Library.
 Aeschylus, Persians. Seven against Thebes. Suppliants. Prometheus Bound. Edited and translated by Alan H. Sommerstein. Loeb Classical Library No. 145. Cambridge, Massachusetts: Harvard University Press, 2009. . Online version at Harvard University Press.
 Antoninus Liberalis, The Metamorphoses of Antoninus Liberalis: A Translation with a Commentary, edited and translated by Francis Celoria, Routledge, 1992. . Online version at ToposText.
 Apollonius Rhodius, Argonautica translated by Robert Cooper Seaton (1853–1915), R. C. Loeb Classical Library Volume 001. London, William Heinemann Ltd, 1912. Online version at the Topos Text Project.
 Athanassakis, Apostolos N., and Benjamin M. Wolkow, The Orphic Hymns, Johns Hopkins University Press, 2013) . Google Books.
 Apollodorus, Apollodorus, The Library, with an English Translation by Sir James George Frazer, F.B.A., F.R.S. in 2 Volumes. Cambridge, Massachusetts, Harvard University Press; London, William Heinemann Ltd. 1921. Online version at the Perseus Digital Library.
 Beekes, Robert S. P., Etymological Dictionary of Greek, Brill, 2009. . Online version at Brill.
 Brill's New Pauly: Encyclopaedia of the Ancient World, Volume 14, Sym-Tub, editors: Hubert Cancik, Helmuth Schneider, Brill, 2009. . Online version at Brill.
 Caldwell, Richard, Hesiod's Theogony, Focus Publishing/R. Pullins Company (June 1, 1987). .
 Cavarzeran, Jacopo, Scholia in Euripidis "Hippolytum": Edizione critica, introduzione, indici, De Gruyter, 2016. . Online version at De Gruyter. Google Books.
 Diehl, Ernst, Procli Diadochi in Platonis Timaeum commentaria, Volume I, Bibliotheca Teubneriana, Leipzig, Teubner, 1903. Internet Archive.
 Diehl, Ernst, Procli Diadochi in Platonis Timaeum commentaria, Volume III, Bibliotheca Teubneriana, Leipzig, Teubner, 1903. Internet Archive.
 Diodorus Siculus, Diodorus Siculus: The Library of History. translated by C. H. Oldfather, twelve volumes, Loeb Classical Library, Cambridge, Massachusetts: Harvard University Press; London: William Heinemann, Ltd. 1989. Online version by Bill Thayer.
 Dwight, Mary Ann, and White, Andrew Dickson, Grecian and Roman mythology, New York, Putnam, 1849. Internet Archive.
 Fontenrose, Joseph Eddy, Python: A Study of Delphic Myth and Its Origins, University of California Press, 1959. . Google Books.
 Fowler, R. L. (2000), Early Greek Mythography: Volume 1: Text and Introduction, Oxford University Press, 2000. .
 Fowler, R. L. (2013), Early Greek Mythography: Volume 2: Commentary, Oxford University Press, 2013. .
 Gantz, Timothy, Early Greek Myth: A Guide to Literary and Artistic Sources, Johns Hopkins University Press, 1996, Two volumes:  (Vol. 1),  (Vol. 2).
 Hard, Robin, The Routledge Handbook of Greek Mythology: Based on H.J. Rose's "Handbook of Greek Mythology", Psychology Press, 2004, . Google Books.
 Harrison, Jane Ellen (1908), Prolegomena to the Study of Greek Religion, second edition, Cambridge: Cambridge University Press, 1908. Internet Archive.
 Harrison, Jane Ellen (1912), Themis: A Study of the Social Origins of Greek Religion, Cambridge: Cambridge University Press, 1912. Internet Archive.
 Hesiod, The Homeric Hymns and Homerica with an English Translation by Hugh G. Evelyn-White, Cambridge, MA., Harvard University Press; London, William Heinemann Ltd. 1914. Online version at the Perseus Digital Library.
 Homer, The Iliad with an English Translation by A.T. Murray, Ph.D. in two volumes. Cambridge, MA., Harvard University Press; London, William Heinemann, Ltd. 1924. Online version at the Perseus Digital Library.
 Homer, The Odyssey with an English Translation by A.T. Murray, PH.D. in two volumes. Cambridge, Massachusetts, Harvard University Press; London, William Heinemann, Ltd. 1919. Online version at the Perseus Digital Library.
 Homeric Hymn 3 to Apollo, in The Homeric Hymns and Homerica with an English Translation by Hugh G. Evelyn-White, Cambridge, Massachusetts, Harvard University Press; London, William Heinemann Ltd. 1914. Online version at the Perseus Digital Library.
 Homeric Hymn 4 to Hermes, in The Homeric Hymns and Homerica with an English Translation by Hugh G. Evelyn-White, Cambridge, Massachusetts, Harvard University Press; London, William Heinemann Ltd. 1914. Online version at the Perseus Digital Library.
 Hyginus, Gaius Julius, Fabulae in Apollodorus' Library and Hyginus' Fabulae: Two Handbooks of Greek Mythology, Translated, with Introductions by R. Scott Smith and Stephen M. Trzaskoma, Hackett Publishing Company,  2007. .
 Hyginus, Astronomica from The Myths of Hyginus translated and edited by Mary Grant. University of Kansas Publications in Humanistic Studies. Online version at the Topos Text Project.
 Kern, Otto. Orphicorum Fragmenta, Berlin, 1922. Internet Archive.
 March, Jennifer R., Dictionary of Classical Mythology, London, Cassell, 1998. .
 Meisner, Dwayne A., Orphic Tradition and the Birth of the Gods, Oxford University Press, 2018. .
 Morford, Mark P. O., Robert J. Lenardon, Classical Mythology, Eighth Edition, Oxford University Press, 2007. .
 Müller, Karl Wilhelm Ludwig, Fragmenta Historicorum Graecorum, Volume I, Paris, Ambroise Firmin-Didot, 1841. Internet Archive. Online version at the DFHG.
 Ovid, Metamorphoses translated by Brookes More (1859–1942). Boston, Cornhill Publishing Co. 1922. Online version at the Topos Text Project.
 The Oxford Classical Dictionary, second edition,  Hammond, N.G.L. and Howard Hayes Scullard (editors), Oxford University Press, 1992. .
 Pindar, Nemean Odes. Isthmian Odes. Fragments, Edited and translated by William H. Race. Loeb Classical Library No. 485. Cambridge, Massachusetts: Harvard University Press, 1997. . Online version at Harvard University Press.
 Quintus Smyrnaeus, Posthomerica, edited and translated by Neil Hopkinson, Loeb Classical Library No. 19, Cambridge, Massachusetts, Harvard University Press, 2018. . Online version at Harvard University Press.
 Smith, William, Dictionary of Greek and Roman Biography and Mythology, London (1873). Online version at the Perseus Digital Library.
 Strabo,  Geography, Editors, H.C. Hamilton, Esq., W. Falconer, M.A., London. George Bell & Sons. 1903. Online version at the Perseus Digital Library
 West, M. L. (1983), The Orphic Poems, Clarendon Press Oxford, 1983. .
 West, M.L., (1985), "Hesiod's Titans" in The Journal of Hellenic Studies, vol. 105, pp. 174–175. .

External links 
 
 

Children of Gaia
Deities in the Iliad
Divine women of Zeus
Greek goddesses
Justice goddesses
Maintenance goddesses
Oracular goddesses
Personifications in Greek mythology
Titans (mythology)
Women of the Trojan war
Olympian deities